Krasnoklyuchevskaya hydroelectric power station is a small hydro power station in Nurimanovsky District Bashkortostan.

Overview 
The hydroelectric power plant was built within a protected area on the karst source Krasniy Klutch, which gave its name to the village of Krasny Klutch.
Designing power, engages in Gidroenergoprom (St. Petersburg), is constructed enterprise BashUralMonolit.

Around the station there are two mutually exclusive views.
According to official figures, the power plant running, the additional activities of the enterprise is a part-time production of bottled water with the same name, which is active, supporting the economy of the district. Improvement location allowed us to solve the problems existed.
Alternately, there is a perception that the station to generate electricity has never been used, is idle, and the construction has caused irreparable damage to the ecology of the area.

References

External links

Hydroelectric power stations in Russia
Dams in Russia
Buildings and structures in Bashkortostan
Dams completed in 2001